Miss International 1999, the 39th Miss International pageant, was held on 14 December 1999 at the U-Port Hall in Tokyo, Japan and hosted by Masumi Okada and Mari Christine. Paulina Gálvez of Colombia was crowned at the end of the event, becoming the second titleholder from her country to win Miss International.

Results

Placements

Contestants

  - Elizabeth Contrard
  - Cindy Vanessa Cam Lin Martinus
  - Natalia Arteaga
  - Alessandra do Nascimento
  Britain - Janeth Kehinde Ayuba
  - Paulina Gálvez
  - Madaussou Kamara
  - Pamela Winkel
  - Afroditi Pericleous
  - Sárka Sikorová
  - Patsi Arias
  - Engy Mohammed Abdalla
  - Saija Palin
  - Céline Cheuva
  - Tania Freuderberg
  - Penelope Lentzou
  - Lourdes Jeanette Rivera
  - Gladys Alvarado
  - Christy Chung
  - Myolie Wu Hang-Yee
  - Ásbjörg Kristinsdóttir
  - Sri Krupa Murali
  - Nofit Shevach
  - Kana Onoda
  - Lee Jae-won
  - Agnese Keiša
  - Clemence Achkar
  - Delfina Zafirova
  - Andrea Franklin Gomez
  - Catherine Seisan
  - Graciela Soto Cámara
  - Claudia Patricia Alaniz Hernández
  - Miyuki Hill
  - Anette Rusten
  - Charlene Kaud Omelau
  - Blanca Elena Espinosa Tuffolon
  - Georgina Sandico
  - Adrianna Gerczew
  - Andreia Antunes
  - Maria Tchebotkevitch
  - Aïcha Faye
  - Janice Koh Yeok Teng
  - Adela Bartkova
  - Carmen Fernández
  - Deborah Tiyéna Bassuka
  - Leïla Bent Abdesalem
  - Merve Alman
  - Liliya Zalunina
  - María Daniela Abasolo Cugnetti
  - Jennifer Glover
  - Andreína Llamozas

Notes

Did not compete
  - Jennefer Jessica Isabel Jenei
  - Luciana José Sandoval
  - Silvana de los Ángeles Gimenez-Valiente

Replacements
  - Jennifer Marthaly Bermudez
  - Lalaine Edson (assumed Binibining Pilipinas-World title)
  - Barbara Leticia Perez Rangel (study commitments)

References

External links
 Pageantopolis - Miss International 1999

1999
1999 in Tokyo
1999 beauty pageants
Beauty pageants in Japan